Harrison is a city in and county seat of Clare County in the U.S. state of Michigan.  The population was 2,150 at the 2020 census.

The community was settled as early as 1877 and was named after William Henry Harrison.  Harrison is near the junction of US 127 and M-61.  US 127 bypasses the city to the east, while Bus. US 127 runs through the center of the city.  Wilson State Park and Budd Lake are located within the city.

History
Harrison was first designated as the new centralized location of the county seat of Clare County in 1877.  It would become a replacement for Farwell, which was the first county seat when Clare County was formally organized in 1871.  The Flint and Pere Marquette Railroad platted the village in 1879 and set aside property for a new county government after the previous courthouse in Farwell burned down.  The Harrison post office opened on January 27, 1880 and was named after former president William Henry Harrison.  The new community incorporated as a village in 1885 and later as a city in 1891.

Geography

The city's motto is "20 Lakes in 20 Minutes" due its proximity to numerous lakes.  Budd Lake is mostly located within the city limits, while the northern coastline extends into Hayes Township.  The only other lake within the city limits is Little Long Lake, which also extends into Hayes Township.

Major highways
 runs south–north just outside the eastern border of the city.
 is a business route of US 127 that runs through the center of the city.
 is a state highway that enters the west-central part of the city and then runs concurrently with Bus. US 127.

Demographics

2010 census
As of the census of 2010, there were 2,114 people, 913 households, and 524 families residing in the city. The racial makeup of the city was 93.7% White, 1.7% African American, 0.8% Native American, 0.5% Asian, 0.2% from other races, and 3.1% from two or more races. Hispanic or Latino of any race were 2.5% of the population.

There were 913 households, of which 26.9% had children under the age of 18 living with them, 37.0% were married couples living together, 15.9% had a female householder with no husband present, 4.5% had a male householder with no wife present, and 42.6% were non-families. 37.2% of all households were made up of individuals, and 17.5% had someone living alone who was 65 years of age or older. The average household size was 2.18 and the average family size was 2.79.

The median age in the city was 42.1 years. 21% of residents were under the age of 18; 10.8% were between the ages of 18 and 24; 22.4% were from 25 to 44; 27.4% were from 45 to 64; and 18.4% were 65 years of age or older. The gender makeup of the city was 49.1% male and 50.9% female.

2000 census
As of the census of 2000, there were 2,108 people, 857 households, and 526 families residing in the city. The racial makeup of the city was 94.78% White, 2.04% African American, 0.62% Native American, 0.71% Asian, 0.43% from other races, and 1.42% from two or more races. Hispanic or Latino of any race were 1.47% of the population.

There were 857 households, out of which 26.6% had children under the age of 18 living with them, 46.0% were married couples living together, 12.5% had a female householder with no husband present, and 38.6% were non-families. 35.2% of all households were made up of individuals, and 18.2% had someone living alone who was 65 years of age or older.  The average household size was 2.24 and the average family size was 2.83.

In the city, the population was spread out, with 22.3% under the age of 18, 9.7% from 18 to 24, 25.6% from 25 to 44, 24.7% from 45 to 64, and 17.7% who were 65 years of age or older.  The median age was 39 years. For every 100 females, there were 93.6 males.  For every 100 females age 18 and over, there were 92.5 males.

The median income for a household in the city was $26,392, and the median income for a family was $35,179. Males had a median income of $32,500 versus $20,909 for females. The per capita income for the city was $15,443.  About 14.1% of families and 18.5% of the population were below the poverty line, including 20.8% of those under age 18 and 15.1% of those age 65 or over.

Education
The city of Harrison is served entirely by Harrison Community Schools, which is centrally located within the city and serves a large part of the northern portion of the county.

Mid Michigan Community College has a Harrison campus located just to the southeast in Hatton Township.

Images

References

External links

City of Harrison official website
Harrison Chamber of Commerce

Cities in Clare County, Michigan
County seats in Michigan
Populated places established in 1877
1877 establishments in Michigan
Michigan State Historic Sites